Mark Sinyangwe (29 December 1979 – 10 August 2011) was a Zambian football defender.

Career
Sinyangwe started his soccer career at Chiwempala Leopards in Chingola before moving to Nkana F.C. After featuring for Nkana, Sinyangwe moved on to play for Nchanga Rangers, Green Buffaloes and Power Dynamos before retiring at Kitwe United.

Sinyangwe was part of the Zambian 2006 African Nations Cup team, who finished third in group C in the first round of competition, thus failing to secure qualification for the quarter-finals.

Clubs
2000–2003: Nkana FC
2004: Nchanga Rangers
2005: Green Buffaloes
2006–20??: Power Dynamos

Personal
On 11 August 2011, Sinyangwe, age 31, died at Mufulira's Ronald Ross Hospital after an illness. He was survived by three children.

References

External links

1979 births
2011 deaths
Zambian footballers
Zambia international footballers
Association football defenders
2002 African Cup of Nations players
2006 Africa Cup of Nations players
Nkana F.C. players
Nchanga Rangers F.C. players
Green Buffaloes F.C. players
Power Dynamos F.C. players